This is a list of episodes from the Fox animated television series Bobby's World. The series premiered on September 8, 1990 and ended on February 23, 1998. A total of 81 half-hour episodes were produced.

Series overview

Episodes

Season 1 (1990–91)

Season 2 (1991)

Season 3 (1992–93)

Season 4 (1993–94)

Season 5 (1994–95)

Season 6 (1995–96)

Season 7 (1997–98)

Notes

References

Bobby's World